The COTIF Women's Football Tournament is a Spanish annual women's football summer tournament held in L'Alcúdia, Valencia. First held in 2012, it is the women's football section of the L'Alcúdia International Football Tournament.

Unlike the male tournament, which is played by U-20 clubs and national teams, the women's tournament is contested by senior teams. It has gradually progressed from local to international in scope.

2011
Held on 12 August. It was a single match confronting the two Valencian teams in the top national championship, Levante UD and Valencia CF. Levante won the first of three trophies in a row.

2012
Held from 16 to 22 August. Levante UD and Valencia CF were joined by two local teams from the second tier's Group 7, CFF Marítim and Mislata CF. The two top teams in a round robin first stage qualified for the final, with Levante again defeating Valencia by the same score.

2013
Held from 16 to 20 August. It was again contested by Primera División's Levante UD and Valencia CF and two clubs from the second category, but in a final four format. For the first time it featured a team from outside the Valencian Community, Fundación Albacete. Levante won again the trophy on penalties.

2014
Held from 17 to 19 September. It was the first edition to include a Primera División from outside Valencia (2013-14 champion FC Barcelona), as well as a foreign team (Montpellier HSC, 4th in the 2013-14 French league).

Barcelona won the final with a single goal by Jennifer Hermoso.

2015
Held from 15 to 19 August. The tournament is expanded from 4 to 6 teams, and a two groups first stage is introduced. For the first time it features national teams, with Namibia and Venezuela. Ivory Coast's Juventus de Yopougon would have been the first club from another continent but it was replaced by RCD Espanyol.

Athletic Bilbao won the final with a single goal by Elixabet Ibarra.

References

Women's football friendly trophies
Recurring sporting events established in 2011
Sports competitions in Valencia